Cathy Williams (born 1957 in Trinidad and Tobago) is a British writer of romance novels in Mills & Boon since 1990.

Biography
Cathy Williams was born in 1957 in Trinidad and Tobago in the West Indies. She lives in Chiswick, London, England, with her three daughters; Charlotte, Olivia and the youngest, Emma, who studied Engineering at Cambridge University while working as a freelance photographer.

Bibliography

Single novels
{{columns-list|colwidth=35em|
A Powerful Attraction (1990)
Caribbean Desire (1991)
Shadow Heart (1991)
Charade of the Heart (1992)
A French Encounter (1992)
Naive Awakening (1992)
Too Scared to Love (1993)
Bittersweet Love (1993)
Shadows of Yesterday (1994)
A Thorn in Paradise (1994)
Unwilling Surrender (1994)
A Burning Passion (1994)
Beyond All Reason (1995)
Vengeful Seduction (1995)
The Price of Deceit (1995)
To Tame a Proud Heart (1996)
A Suitable Mistress (1996)
A Natural Mother (1997)
Accidental Mistress (1997)
Willing to Wed (1997)
The Unmarried Husband (1998)
Sleeping with the Boss (1998)
A Daughter for Christmas (1998)
Wife for Hire (1999)
The Baby Verdict (1999)
A Scandalous Engagement (2000)
The Baby Scandal (2000)
The Boss's Proposal (2001)
Merger by Matrimony (2001)
Secretary on Demand (2001)
The Rich Man's Mistress (2002)
Riccardo's Secret Child (2002)
The Millionaire's Revenge (2002)
Constantinou's Mistress (2002)
His Convenient Mistress (2003)
The Greek Tycoon's Secret Child (2003)
His Virgin Secretary (2004)
The Italian Tycoon's Mistress (2004)
The Billionaire Boss's Bride (2004)
In the Banker's Bed (2005)
The Greek's Forbidden Bride (2005)
At the Italian's Command (2005)
The Italian's Pregnant Mistress (2005)
At the Greek Tycoon's Bidding (2006)
At The Greek Tycoon's Pleasure (2006)
The Italian Boss's Secretary Mistress (2006)
Kept by the Spanish Billionaire (2007)
The Italian Billionaire's Secret Love-Child (2007)
Rafael's Suitable Bride (2008)
Ruthless Tycoon, Inexperienced Mistress (2009)
The Italian's One-Night Love-Child (2009)
Powerful Boss, Prim Miss Jones (2010)
The Secretary's Scandalous Secret (2010)
Her Impossible Boss (2011)
One Night in Rome (2011)
The Truth Behind his Touch (2012)
The Girl He'd Overlooked (2012)
A Tempestuous Temptation (2012)
The Secret Casella Baby (2013)
A Deal with Di Capua (2013)
His Temporary Mistress (2013)
Secrets of a Ruthless Tycoon (2014)
The Argentinian's Demand (2014)
The Uncompromising Italian (2014)
The Real Romero (2015)
At Her Boss's Pleasure (2015)
A Pawn in the Playboy's Game (2015)
The Wedding Night Debt (2015)
Seduced into Her Boss's Service (2016)
A Virgin For Vasquez (2016)
Snowbound With His Innocent Temptation (2016)
Bought to Wear the Billionaire's Ring (2017)
The Secret Sanchez Heir (2017)
Cipriani's Innocent Captive (2017)
Legacy Of His Revenge (2017)
A Deal For Her Innocence (2018)
A Diamond Deal With Her Boss (2018)The Tycoon's Ultimate Conquest (2018)Contracted for the Spaniard's Heir (2019)Marriage Bargain With His Innocent (2019)The Italian's Christmas Proposition (2019)His Secretary's Nine-Month Notice (2020)The Forbidden Cabrera Brother (2020)
}}

Italian TitansWearing The De Angelis Ring (2015)The Surprise De Angelis Baby (2016)

Bachelor Tycoons seriesA Reluctant Wife (1998)

Omnibus in collaborationHis Secretary Bride (2000) (with Kim Lawrence)Marriages by Arrangement (2000) (with Diana Hamilton and Anne Weale)Nine to Five (2001) (with Kim Lawrence and Sandra Marton)Caribbean Caress (2002) (with Catherine Spencer)Passion in Paradise (2004) (with Jacqueline Baird and Sara Craven)Secrets and Sins... Revealed! / From Lust to Love (2005) (with Miranda Lee)Falling for the Boss (2005) (with Helen Brooks and Barbara McMahon)His Boardroom Mistress (2005) (with Helen Bianchin and Sandra Marton)Love in the City (2005) (with Miranda Lee and Anne McAllister)Her Nine Month Miracle (2005) (with Barbara Hannay and Marion Lennox)Their Secret Child (2006) (with Kim Lawrence and Jane Porter)Red-Hot Revenge (2006) (with Jacqueline Baird and Lee Wilkinson)Millionaire's Mistress (2006) (with Jacqueline Baird and Lynne Graham)The Tycoon's Virgin (2007) (with Daphne Clair and Sandra Field)His Convenient Woman'' (2007) (with Diana Hamilton and Barbara McMahon)

External links
 Cathy Williams's webpage at Harlequin Enterprises Ltd

1953 births
Living people
British romantic fiction writers
Trinidad and Tobago emigrants to the United Kingdom
British women novelists
Women romantic fiction writers